Richard Buckman, also known as the Barracuda Buckman, is a New Zealand rugby union player who plays for the Kobelco Kobe Steelers in the Japan Rugby League One competition.

Early life

Buckman was born in Palmerston North, and went to Argyll School.  In 2002, he was the Ross Shield player of the tournament. In 2004, he was selected for the Central Districts Under 15 Rugby League side and was a standout player. He attended Napier Boys' High School and was a member of their 1st XV.

Rugby career

Buckman plays his club rugby for Napier Technical and was a member of the 2008 Hawke's Bay Magpies Wider Training Group. He made his debut off the bench for the Magpies against Otago at Carisbrook. In 2009 he was named in the squad and got his first start against Southland. In 2011 he made his debut off the bench for the Hurricanes.

2009 season

Buckman came close to being selected for the New Zealand side for the Under-20 World Cup. He was named in the Blackbirds team and mainly used off the bench. He was selected for two starts, one against Southland at Rugby Park in Invercargill and the second in the semi-final against Canterbury at AMI Stadium in Christchurch.

2011 season

In January 2011 Buckman was selected for the Hurricanes Wider Training Group. He played in all but one of the Hurricanes Development Team games and was then called up to train with the full squad at the end of April. On 4 June he make his debut off the bench as replacement for winger Hosea Gear at the end of the match against the Lions at Westpac Stadium in Wellington.

References

External links
 Hurricanes profile
 Hawke's Bay profile
 itsrugby.co.uk profile

Living people
1989 births
New Zealand rugby union players
Hurricanes (rugby union) players
Hawke's Bay rugby union players
Highlanders (rugby union) players
Rugby union centres
Rugby union wings
Rugby union players from Napier, New Zealand
People educated at Napier Boys' High School
Saitama Wild Knights players
New Zealand expatriate rugby union players
Expatriate rugby union players in Japan
New Zealand expatriate sportspeople in Japan
Barbarian F.C. players
Kobelco Kobe Steelers players